John "Twiggy" Williams (born September 19, 1942) was a Canadian football player who played for the Calgary Stampeders, Hamilton Tiger-Cats, Edmonton Eskimos and Toronto Argonauts. He won the Grey Cup with Hamilton in 1972. Williams played college football at the University of New Mexico. His son, John Williams also played in the CFL.

References

1942 births
Living people
American players of Canadian football
Players of American football from Fort Worth, Texas
Calgary Stampeders players
Hamilton Tiger-Cats players
Edmonton Elks players
Toronto Argonauts players
New Mexico Lobos football players
Canadian football defensive backs
American football defensive backs